Plasmodium auffenbergi is a parasite of the genus Plasmodium subgenus Carinamoeba.

Like all Plasmodium species P. auffenbergi has both vertebrate and insect hosts. The vertebrate hosts for this parasite are reptiles.

Taxonomy 

The parasite was first described by Telford in 2016

The meronts are cruciform or fan shaped. They measure 3.0 x 2.2 microns. They produce 2-5 merozoites.

The gametocytes are spherical to ovoid and measure 4.7 x 3.9 microns. Male and female gametocytes do not differ in size or morphology.

Distribution 

This species is found in the Philippines.

Hosts 

This species infects the peacock monitor (Varanus auffenbergi). This lizard is also known as Auffenberg's monitor.

References 

auffenbergi